Shudder is an American over-the-top subscription video on demand service featuring horror, thriller and supernatural fiction titles, owned and operated by AMC Networks. The streaming service offers original films and TV series like Creepshow, inspired by the 1982 movie of the same name directed by George A. Romero. Shudder also has well-known movies like 1978's Halloween, documentary series, and an annual Halloween "Ghoul Log" reminiscent of the Yule Log that's on TV during the holiday season.

Distribution
Shudder began with an invite-only beta testing in the United States the summer of 2015. By October 2016, Shudder was fully out of beta testing and had expanded to Canada, the United Kingdom and Ireland.

Shudder is available on Android and Apple mobile devices, Amazon Fire devices, Android TV, Apple TV, Roku, Xbox One, Xbox Series X/S, Chromecast as well as subscription via Amazon Video in monthly or annual subscriptions. Shudder was  also available as part of the VRV combo pack from August 2017 through July 2019.

In the US, a monthly subscription currently runs at $5.99 each month, while in other countries the price is adjusted according to the local currency.

On August 16, 2020, Shudder extended its operations to Australia and New Zealand. 

In October 2022, Shudder was included as part of a bundle package during the launch of the AMC+ streaming service in New Zealand.

Content
In October 2016, Aja Romano writing for Vox noted that Shudder had over 500 horror films with their closest competitor, Screambox, carrying 400. Romano said Shudder had an "impressive selection of higher-quality films." Charlie Lyne, writing for The Guardian, notes that the UK version of Shudder carried around 200 films. Channel curators Sam Zimmerman and Colin Geddes offer categories like "Urban Decay", "Slashics", and "Not Your Ordinary Bloodsucker", which break the library down to specific sub-categories. Zimmerman previously worked for Fangoria and Shock Til You Drop while Geddes was previously a film programmer for the Toronto International Film Festival.

In late 2016, Shudder began carving out windows of exclusivity, premiering Rob Zombie's 31 two weeks before the DVD release and exclusively carrying the 4K restoration of Don Coscarelli's Phantasm. In another streaming exclusive, in March 2017, Shudder began carrying the full 109-minute unrated version of The Devils. This is the first time since the film's release in 1971 that the unrated cut of the film has been available in the United States. In June 2017, Shudder announced a full slate of original series in development, including Riprore, from director Patty Jenkins, and an adaptation of Emily Schultz's novel, The Blondes. In 2018, Shudder continued to release exclusive and original films and series, including Mayhem starring Steven Yeun and Samara Weaving, Downrange directed by Ryuhei Kitamura, Revenge, and the Syfy series Channel Zero and others.

In July 2018, Shudder hosted a 24-hour live event with legendary horror host Joe Bob Briggs titled The Last Drive-in with Joe Bob Briggs during which fans got to watch films such as Tourist Trap and Sleepaway Camp with Joe Bob's famous commentary included throughout. During the premiere, Shudder's servers crashed as a result of an overwhelming number of subscribers attempting to access the service's new Live Stream feature. Despite the server errors, the series received critical acclaim from critics and horror fans alike. Shortly after the marathon, Shudder announced that they were bringing Briggs back for additional events in 2018 and 2019. On July 20, Shudder announced on social media the series would be returning for a full 9-episode season. After success with season 1, a second season was confirmed on May 22, 2019.

Since January 23, 2020, Shudder has distributed The Dead Lands, a Māori–themed supernatural series set in pre-contact New Zealand, that was jointly produced by AMC and New Zealand public broadcaster TVNZ. Shudder distributes the series in the US, Canada, UK, and Ireland while TVNZ On Demand has distribution rights for New Zealand.

On July 20, 2021, the horror-genre film Rot was released on Shudder platform.

Exclusives and Originals

References

External links

Subscription video on demand services
Internet properties established in 2015
AMC Networks